Wilhelm Reinhold Walter Koehler (Köhler until 1932) (17 December 1884 – 3 November 1959) was a German art historian. He was a professor at the University of Jena from 1924, but moved to Harvard University in 1932 as a result of clashes with the Nazi government. Named to the William Dorr Boardman Professor of Fine Arts in 1950, he retired in 1953.

References 

1884 births
1959 deaths
German art historians
German emigrants to the United States
Harvard University faculty
Corresponding Fellows of the British Academy